Rosavirus is a genus of viruses in the order Picornavirales, in the family Picornaviridae. Human and  rodents serve as natural hosts. There are three species in this genus.

Taxonomy
The genus contains the following species:
 Rosavirus A
 Rosavirus B
 Rosavirus C

Structure
Viruses in Rosavirus are non-enveloped, with icosahedral, spherical, and round geometries, and T=pseudo3 symmetry. The diameter is around 30 nm. Genomes are linear and non-segmented, around 9kb in length.

Life cycle
Viral replication is cytoplasmic. Entry into the host cell is achieved by attachment of the virus to host receptors, which mediates endocytosis. Replication follows the positive stranded RNA virus replication model. Positive stranded RNA virus transcription is the method of transcription. The virus exits the host cell by lysis, and viroporins. Human and rodents serve as the natural host.

References

External links
 Viralzone: Rosavirus
 ICTV

Picornaviridae
Virus genera